Cobitis fahireae is a species of loach endemic to Turkey where it occurs in intermittent rivers.

References

Cobitis
Endemic fauna of Turkey
Fish described in 1998
Taxa named by Teodor T. Nalbant
Taxonomy articles created by Polbot